Athletics competition at the 2009 Games of the Small States of Europe was held from 2–6 June 2009 in Nicosia, Cyprus.

Medal summary

Men

Women

Men's results

100 metres
June 2Wind: +1.2 m/s

200 metres
June 6Wind: +0.1 m/s

400 metres

Heats – June 2

Final – June 4

800 metres
June 2

1500 metres
June 6

5000 metres
June 2

10,000 metres
June 6

110 metres hurdles
June 4Wind: +0.8 m/s

400 metres hurdles
June 4

3000 metres steeplechase
June 4

4 x 100 meters relay
June 6

4 x 400 meters relay
June 6

High jump
June 2

Pole vault
June 2

Long jump
June 4

Triple jump
June 6

Shot put
June 6

Discus throw
June 4

Hammer throw
June 2

Javelin throw
June 2

Women's results

100 metres

Heats – June 2Wind:Heat 1: -1.0 m/s, Heat 2: +3.6 m/s

Final – June 2Wind:-0.7 m/s

200 metres
June 6Wind: -0.3 m/s

400 metres
June 4

800 metres
June 2

1500 metres
June 4

5000 metres
June 6

10,000 metres
June 2

100 metres hurdles
June 6Wind: -0.9 m/s

400 metres hurdles
June 4

4 x 100 meters relay
June 6

4 x 400 meters relay
June 6

High jump
June 6

Pole vault
June 4

Long jump
June 4

Triple jump
June 2

Shot put
June 6

Javelin throw
June 2

Medal table

Participating nations

 (5)
 (65) (Host team)
 (21)
 (1)
 (24)
 (19)
 (19)
 (7)

References
Athletics Site of the 2009 Games of the Small States of Europe

Games of the Small States of Europe Athletics
Athletics
2009
2009 Games of the Small States of Europe